Jasná Páka is a Czech rock band formed in 1981 by Michal Ambrož and Vladimír "Dáda" Albrecht. The group was banned in 1984, and most of its members subsequently founded the group Hudba Praha. In 2008, Jasná Páka reformed, with a new lineup. Hudba Praha continues to play as a separate group to this day. Jasná Páka has released one studio album, as well as several live and compilation albums. Ambrož died in 2022.

History
Jasná Páka was formed in 1981 by Michal Ambrož and Vladimír "Dáda" Albrecht. In its first incarnation, the band also included David Koller on drums, Jan Ivan Wünsch on bass, as well as Bohumil and Vladimír Zatloukal on guitars. They were rounded out by a duo of "screaming" female backing vocalists, Zdena Pištěková and Markéta Vojtěchová.

In 1984, Jasná Páka was banned from performing in public. Ambrož wanted to continue playing music, but rather than going underground with Jasná Páka, he retired the original name and formed the group Hudba Praha. Koller and Bohumil Zatloukal left to join 5P (Luboš Pospíšil's band), and Albrecht decided to dedicate himself to painting. Wünsch, Vladimír Zatloukal, Vojtěchová, and Pištěková remained with the new group.

In 2008, Michal Ambrož and Vladimír Zatloukal reformed Jasná Páka with a returning David Koller, adding new members, and six years later, they released their debut (and to date, only) full-length studio album, Černá deska.

Ambrož died on 31 October 2022.

Band members
Current
 David Koller – drums, vocals
 Vladimír Zatloukal – guitar
 Petr Váša – vocals
 Marek Minárik – bass
 Radovan Jelínek – keyboards, guitar, vocals
 Pavla Táboříková – backing vocals
 Magdaléna Krištofeková – backing vocals

Past
  (died 2022) – vocals, guitar
 Vladimír "Dáda" Albrecht – vocals
 Jan Ivan Wünsch – bass
 Karel Malík – saxophone, vocals
 Bohumil Zatloukal – guitar
 Zdena Pištěková – backing vocals
 Alena Daňková – backing vocals
 Markéta Ambrožová – backing vocals
 Petra Studená – backing vocals

Discography
Studio albums
 Černá deska (2014)

Live albums
 Jasná páka (1985)
 25 pecek (2007)
 Černá deska + Stará vlna s novým obsahem (2014)

Compilations
 10 let Hudby Praha/Jasná páka (1992)
 Jasná páka – od začátku do konce (2001)

Demos and other albums
 Jasná páka – Nashledanou (1985)
 Jasná páka (1990)

References

External links
 
 

Czech rock music groups
Czech punk rock groups
Musical groups established in 1981
1981 establishments in Czechoslovakia